Joseph Schow  is a Canadian politician who was elected in the 2019 Alberta general election to represent the electoral district of Cardston-Siksika in the 30th Alberta Legislature. He is a member of the United Conservative Party, and he has been serving as deputy whip since April 30, 2019.

References

United Conservative Party MLAs
Living people
21st-century Canadian politicians
Year of birth missing (living people)